Julius Leopold Klein (Hungarian: Klein Gyula Lipót; 1810 – 2 August 1876) was a German writer of Jewish origin born at Miskolc, Hungary.

Life
Klein was educated at the gymnasium in Pest, and studied medicine in Vienna and Berlin. After travelling in Italy and Greece, he settled as a man of letters in Berlin, where he remained until his death.

Works
He was the author of many dramatic works, among others the historical tragedies Maria von Medici (1841), Luines (1842), Zenobia (1847), Moreto (1859), Maria (1860), Strafford (1862), and Heliodora (1867); and the comedies Die Herzogin (1848), Ein Schützling (1850), and Voltaire (1862). The tendency of Klein as a dramatist was to become bombastic and obscure, but many of his characters are vigorously conceived, and in nearly all his tragedies there are passages of brilliant rhetoric.

Klein is chiefly known as the author of the elaborate though uncompleted Geschichte des Dramas (1865–1876), in which he undertook to record the history of the drama from the earliest times. He died when about to enter upon the Elizabethan era, to the treatment of which he had looked forward as the chief part of his task. The work, which is in thirteen bulky volumes, gives proof of immense learning, but is marred by eccentricities of style and judgment.

Klein's Dramatische Werke were collected in 7 vols. (1871–1872).

References

External links
 

1810 births
1876 deaths
People from Miskolc
Hungarian Jews
German people of Hungarian-Jewish descent
19th-century Hungarian dramatists and playwrights
19th-century German dramatists and playwrights
Hungarian literary critics
German literary critics
Hungarian male dramatists and playwrights
German male dramatists and playwrights
19th-century German male writers
German male non-fiction writers
19th-century Hungarian male writers